Andrew Keogh may refer to:

 Andy Keogh (born 1986), Irish footballer
 Andrew Keogh (librarian) (1869–1953), English-born American librarian